Santiago Federico Toloza (born 28 October, 2002, Morteros) is an Argentine footballer who plays for Arsenal de Sarandí of the Argentine Primera Division on loan from Talleres de Córdoba,
as an attacking midfielder.

Early life
From Morteros, Córdoba, he played his youth team football at 9 de Julio de Morteros until 2015 when he joined Talleres de Córdoba. In 2018 he won a youth league with the club.

Career

Talleres de Córdoba
In 2020 he made his first preseason training with the first team squad of Talleres de Córdoba. That same year, 2020, he signed his first professional contract with Talleres.

2022 debut
Toloza made his senior debut in the first team of Talleres, in a Copa Argentina match against Güemes
in the Santiago del Estero on 17 March, 2022. He came on as a substitute 32 minutes into the second half in place of Federico Girotti during a 4-0 win for his side. Tolaza made his Copa Libertadores debut Libertadores, against Sporting Cristal, 27 April, 2022 at the Estadio Mario Alberto Kempes, shortly before his first senior league start against Atletico Tucuman on 30
April, 2022. In 2022 Toloza made 16 appearances in all competitions for Talleres de Córdoba.

2023: Arsenal de Sarandi (loan) 
On 7 January, 2023 Arsenal de Sarandi confirmed the loan signing of Toloza on a one-year deal. Toloza scored his first senior league goal on February 4, 2023 for Arsenal de Sarandí against Estudiantes.

International career
In September 2018 he was called
up to the Argentine under-17
squad. He played on October 4, 2018 against the United States under 17 team, in a 2-1 win for his country. Prior to this, Toloza had been called up to Argentine age group football teams at under-15 and under-16 level.

References

External links

2002 births
Living people
Argentine footballers
Association football midfielders
9 de Julio de Morteros players
Arsenal de Sarandí footballers
Talleres de Córdoba footballers
Argentine Primera División players
Sportspeople from Córdoba Province, Argentina